Pipersville is an unincorporated community in the town of Ixonia in Jefferson County, Wisconsin, United States. It is located at the intersection of Jefferson County Roads P and E, about 4 miles southeast of Watertown.

Notes

Unincorporated communities in Jefferson County, Wisconsin
Unincorporated communities in Wisconsin